Goppel or Göppel is a last name.

It is shared by the following people:
Alfons Goppel (1905–1991), German politician
Josef Göppel (1950–2022), German politician
Lena Göppel (born 2001), Liechtensteiner association football player
Maximilian Göppel (born 1997), Liechtensteiner association football player
Thijmen Goppel (born 1997), Dutch association football player
Thomas Goppel (born 1947), German politician

See also
Agnes Goppel, played by Juliet Aykroyd in Man of Straw, a British TV series